Tinah Priscilla Williams is a South African politician serving as a Member of the North West Provincial Legislature since May 2019. She represents the African National Congress. In June 2019, Williams was named chairperson of the Portfolio Committee on Social Development and Health.

Political career
Williams is a member of the African National Congress. She was elected to the North West Provincial Legislature in the 2019 general election. She took office as a member on 22 May 2019.

In June 2019, she was appointed chairperson of the Portfolio Committee on Social Development and Health.

References

Living people
Year of birth missing (living people)
African National Congress politicians
Members of the North West Provincial Legislature
21st-century South African politicians
21st-century South African women politicians
People from North West (South African province)
Women members of provincial legislatures of South Africa